Buni (also spelled Booni) is a town and the headquarters of Upper Chitral District in Khyber Pakhtunkhwa, Pakistan.

Demography
The residents of Buni are Khos, and they speak Khowar which is spoken and understood throughout Chitral valley.
Urdu, the national language of Pakistan, is also spoken and understood.

Climate
The climate is considered to be a local Mediterranean climate. During the year, there is abundant rainfall. This climate is considered to be Csa to the Köppen-Geiger climate classification. The average annual temperature in Buni is 15.6 °C. About 418 mm of precipitation falls annually.

Educational institutions
There's a number of educational institution in Buni.
University of Buni(under construction)
Aga Khan High School Buni 
Govt Degree College Buni
Govt High School Buni 
Govt Girls Degree College Buni
Pamir School & College Buni
Space Era Model School Buni
Oxford Public School Buni
Pearl College Buni

See also
Buni Zom
Mastuj

References

Populated places in Chitral District
Hill stations in Pakistan
Populated places along the Silk Road